Xincun may refer to the following locations in China:

Xincun Hui Ethnic Township, Huanghua, Hebei
Xincun Subdistrict, Beijing, in Fengtai District, Beijing
Xincun Subdistrict, Wuhan, in Jiang'an District, Wuhan, Hubei
Towns
Xincun, Funan County, Anhui
Xincun, Lingshui County, in Lingshui Li Autonomous County, Hainan
Xincun, Xinzheng, Henan
Xincun, Chuxiong, in Chuxiong City, Yunnan